Achyrocline is a genus of flowering plants in the Asteraceae described as a genus in 1838. It is native to Latin America and Africa.

 Species

References

 
Asteraceae genera
Taxa named by Augustin Pyramus de Candolle
Taxonomy articles created by Polbot